HNLMS Pieter de Bitter was a  of the Royal Netherlands Navy that served in World War II.

Service history
Pieter de Bitter was scuttled at Surabaya on 6 March 1942.

Jan van Amstel-class minesweepers
Ships built in Rotterdam
1936 ships
World War II minesweepers of the Netherlands
World War II shipwrecks in the Pacific Ocean
Maritime incidents in March 1942